The 2014–15 season is CSMS Iași's 5th season in the Romanian football league system, and their second season in the Liga I. CSMS were promoted to the first league after winning Seria I of the 2013–14 Liga II.

Month by month review

June

July

August

Players

First team squad

Transfers

In

Out

Competitions

Overall

Liga I

League table

Results summary

Results by round

Matches

Last updated: 21 August 2014

Cupa României

Round of 32

Last updated: 2 July 2014

Cupa Ligii

Play-off round

Round of 16

Last updated: 21 August 2014

Pre-season and friendlies

Last updated: 21 August 2014

See also

 2014–15 Liga I
 2014–15 Cupa României
 2014–15 Cupa Ligii

References

See also

2014–15 Cupa României
2014–15 Cupa Ligii
2014–15 Liga I

FC Politehnica Iași (2010) seasons
Studentesc Iasi